was a town located in Tōhaku District, Tottori Prefecture, Japan.

As of 2003, the town had an estimated population of 8,800 and a population density of 242.89 per km2. The total area was 36.23 km2.

On October 1, 2005, Daiei, along with the town of Hōjō (also from Tōhaku District), was merged to create the town of Hokuei.

Daiei is also the hometown of Japanese manga artist Gosho Aoyama, best known for his manga series Case Closed.

References

External links
Hokuei official website 

Dissolved municipalities of Tottori Prefecture
Populated places disestablished in 2005
2005 disestablishments in Japan
Tōhaku District, Tottori
Hokuei, Tottori